Enemies is a 1981 role-playing game supplement published by Hero Games for Champions.

Contents
Enemies is one of the first supplementary releases for the superhero RPG Champions, presenting 36 villains of varying expertise and intent, each with detailed statistics and illustrations.

Reception
Aaron Allston reviewed Enemies in The Space Gamer No. 47. Allston commented that "Buyers wanting to see interesting and useful applications of Champions character-building would do well to pick this up."

Pete Tamlyn reviewed Enemies I for Imagine magazine, and stated that "the designers manage to demonstrate their awareness of the importance of atmosphere by giving each character an interesting background. Even so I would not normally recommend anyone with a decent imagination to bother with this, were it not for the fact that the villains get used elsewhere."

Reviews
 Different Worlds #32 (Jan./Feb., 1984)

References

Champions (role-playing game) supplements
Role-playing game supplements introduced in 1981